Kathy Ruttenberg is an American artist based in New York's Hudson Valley. Originally a painter, she is known for her ceramic sculptures of a "wonder world in which species merge and figures serve as landscapes." Her work is primarily concerned with the figure, the natural world, and human relationships.

To date, Ruttenberg has had more than thirty-five solo shows and her work has been included in more than a hundred group shows. Her sculptures have been acquired by the Mamirauá Sustainable Development Reserve in Amazonas, Brazil, the Tisch Children's Zoo in Central Park in New York City, and the permanent collection of the Museo Internazionale delle Cermiche, as well as by private collectors.

Her work has been featured in a variety of major publications including: The New York Times, New York Magazine, American Craft Magazine, Neue Keramik, Clay Times, Ceramics Monthly, New York Daily News, Avenue, and Ceramics Art and Perception

Early life and education
Ruttenberg was born in Chicago, Illinois, where she lived until her family moved to New York City. She received her BFA with Honors from School of Visual Arts in 1981, majoring in animation and painting while also working with a variety of other mediums. In 1980, her hand-drawn animated film won an honorable mention in the Varna International Film Festival. She continued her education with graduate courses from New York University in Italy and School of Visual Arts in Morocco. In 1992, she relocated to Woodstock, New York, where she has been living and working ever since.

Work
Ruttenberg's work is both figurative and biographical, and makes use of symbols and story telling to convey meaning. Her work expresses a distinctly feminine perspective, with mostly women as main characters and masculine characters depicted in complex but usually secondary roles. Thematically, the natural world and our relationship to it underpin her work and feature broadly in her narratives. Of her process, Ruttenberg says, "I resolve my life's issues through expression in my work ... I think the cocktail of strong emotions and fantasy can take one's creativity to deep and unchartered territory. With the clay and the watercolour, the two mediums I am now most drawn to, I have found a very easy channel to express ... mythical story telling."

Reviews and commentary

Personal life
Ruttenberg's residence and studio is also home to her animals. A feature in American Craft Magazine states, "On the grounds of Ruttenberg's home are more than fifty rescued animals, from dogs and cats to turkeys and horses. It's a private zoo that functions as a source of artistic inspiration, as well as an animal haven."

In Julien's Journal, she stated, "The anthropomorphic side to my work comes from not just seeing them out in the woods, but having contact with animals every day, feeding them and taking care of them."

Ruttenberg has donated her designs, products, and artworks to benefit Green Chimneys (a Brewster-based nonprofit that uses animals to help special-needs children), the Wildlife Conservation Society (WCS), the Lewa Wildlife Conservancy, the Lemur Conservation Foundation, and the Woodstock Land Conservancy.

References

External links

Living people
American women sculptors
Artists from New York City
People from Woodstock, New York
Artists from Chicago
School of Visual Arts alumni
Year of birth missing (living people)
Sculptors from New York (state)
Sculptors from Illinois
21st-century American women artists